Carson Jorgensen (born 1988/1989) is the chairman of the Utah Republican Party. He was elected in convention on May 1, 2021.   At the time of his election, Jorgensen was 31 years old, making him the youngest state Republican Party chair in Utah history and one of the youngest state Republican chairs ever elected in the United States.

References

21st-century American politicians
Living people
State political party chairs of Utah
Utah politicians
Utah Republicans
Year of birth missing (living people)